Willy Koppen (Overveen January 7, 1924 - De Bilt October 22, 2002) was a Dutch motorcycle racer who was one of the first women participating at international motor races during the fifties.

Early years
Koppen grew up in Overveen in a non-motorcycling family, but very close to the Zandvoort Circuit where she also was riding. She is holder of the “80 star” of the circuit and drove her brand new Adler motorcycle to 130 km/h. In order to afford her hobby, she worked as a nurse or secretary during winter time and then could be fully focused on motorsport in summer time. She was her own mechanic and, as an autodidact, she learned how to maintain and adjust an engine. In 1949 she obtained her motorcycle license and started to gain experience by driving through the Netherlands on a borrowed Saroléa motorcycle. In 1950 she bought her first motorcycle, a Zündapp DB 200 from 1938, with which she made her first long distance trip to Naples. In 1951 she made an other long trip to southern France and Switzerland in 1951, where she gained experience in mountain driving.

Racing career
Koppen took part in the FIM Trophée in Madrid, Spain, in 1952 for the first time. In 1953 she became the first woman to win the Coupe de Dame of the 1600 kilometer non-stop rally of the FIM Trophée de Monaco, a 32-hour rally with time, speed and fuel consumption penalty points regulation. She drove an Adler MB 250 Motor. The following year, in 1954, she was the only woman to cross the finish line, leaving many men behind in the final results. At both rallies she drove as a private solo driver, without a team nor team support. In 1953 she drove a factory Adler MB 250 engine, provided by the Adler Company. Having a crankcase protection and overhead exhaust pipes, as on the later Adler MB 250 S, made it suitable for the fast windy corners in the Alps. In 1954 she drove her own Adler MB 250. After the race she broke her foot in a motorcycle accident in Italy, but right after she participated at the ninth Alpine Rally in Schio, Italy. In 1955 she was provided with a trial enduro bike from the English motorcycle manufacturer Francis-Barnett, so she could participate in rough terrain competition. Unfortunately, the KNMV did not allow her to participate in road races. As a woman she only got permission for the junior trails and junior reliability rides.

Other motor activities
In addition to racing, Koppen became known for her long distance solo tours throughout Europe into Turkey and Israel. Her long journeys were reported in the Dutch media such as the Dutch magazine MOTOR. Her first motorcycle was a 1939 pre-war Zündapp DB 200, which she disassembled, reassembled and adjusted three times as a self-taught constructor, before setting out on her first long journey to Naples.

Personal
After her active sports career, she got married and had two children. After twenty-five years she picked up motorcycling again and continued to do so until her death. First she drove a Velocette LE and then the BMW R45 with MZ sidecar came along, with her dog Dempsey always accompanying her. In 1999, to celebrate her 75th birthday and that she had started motorsport 50 years earlier, a race of honor with classic motorcycles  was organized. She was an honorary member of several motorcycle clubs in Europe. Her last ride was on her MZ sidecar, during an impressive parade of antique motorcycles that paid tribute to her on October 26, 2002, after she passed away October 22 at the age of 78.

Races

References

Dutch motocross riders
1924 births
2002 deaths
Female motorcycle racers
20th-century Dutch women